Product may refer to:

Business
 Product (business), an item that can be offered to a market to satisfy the desire or need of a customer.
 Product (project management), a deliverable or set of deliverables that contribute to a business solution

Mathematics
 Product (mathematics)

Algebra
 Direct product

Set theory
 Cartesian product of sets

Group theory
 Direct product of groups
 Semidirect product
 Product of group subsets
 Wreath product
 Free product
 Zappa–Szép product (or knit product), a generalization of the direct and semidirect products

Ring theory
 Product of rings
 Ideal operations, for product of ideals

Linear algebra
 Scalar multiplication
 Matrix multiplication
 Inner product, on an inner product space
 Exterior product or wedge product
 Multiplication of vectors:
 Dot product
 Cross product
 Seven-dimensional cross product
 Triple product, in vector calculus
 Tensor product

Topology
 Product topology

Algebraic topology
 Cap product
 Cup product
 Slant product

Homotopy theory
 Smash product
 Wedge sum (or wedge product)

Category theory
 Internal product, in a monoidal category
 Product (category theory), a generalization of mathematical products
 Fibre product or pullback
 Coproduct or pushout

Probability theory
 Wick product of random variables

Graph theory
 Graph product

Music
 Product (Brand X album), 1979
 Product (De Press album), 1982
 Product (Sophie album), 2015
 Product, a three-CD compilation set by Buzzcocks

Other uses
 Product (chemistry), the species formed from chemical reactions
 Hairstyling product, such as hairspray or hair gel, generally referred to as simply "product"

See also
 Production (disambiguation)